"Stay With Me" is a song by DeBarge, issued on their acclaimed album, In a Special Way.

Song information
The song was composed in 1982 by siblings El, Marty and Bunny DeBarge. The lyrics describe a young man who wants his lover to stay despite relationship worries. El DeBarge sang lead vocals.

Credits
Lead vocals by El DeBarge
Background vocals by El DeBarge, Randy DeBarge and Bunny DeBarge

1983 songs
DeBarge songs
Songs written by El DeBarge